The Apple AudioVision 14 Display is a 14-inch Trinitron display that was manufactured by Apple Inc. This display is unique since it is the only display ever to use the HDI-45 connector, capable of transferring video to the screen, video capture input from an S-Video source, audio output, audio input, and Apple Desktop Bus (ADB) all through one cable. The monitor also has a built-in microphone. The included driver adds the following specialized functionality to the Sound control panel:

 Internal speaker volume
 Audio output jack volume
 Internal microphone level
 Audio input level
 External audio input selection between line and microphone sensitivity

These settings are sent to and from the monitor's microcontroller through ADB. Power Macintosh, Performa and Workgroup Server models 61xx, 71xx and 81xx all have the special HDI-45 port built-in. All other models require a special adapter to connect audio, video, and ADB separately to this monitor.

The video input port present on the right side of the monitor was not supported by Apple. It shipped with a rubber plug in this port as seen in the adjacent image.

See also 
 HDI-45 connector

References 

 Steven Kan's 6100 Upgrade Site
 AudioVision connector

Apple Inc. peripherals
Apple Inc. displays